West Germany (Federal Republic of Germany) competed at the 1972 Winter Olympics in Sapporo, Japan.

Medalists

Alpine skiing

Men

Men's slalom

Women

Biathlon

Men

1One minute added per close miss (a hit in the outer ring), two minutes added per complete miss.

Bobsleigh

Cross-country skiing

Men

Men's 4 × 10 km relay

Women

Women's 3 × 5 km relay

Figure skating

Women

Pairs

Ice hockey

First round
Winners (in bold) entered the Medal Round. Other teams played a consolation round for 7th-11th places.

|}

Consolation Round

West Germany 5-0 Switzerland
West Germany 6-2 Yugoslavia
West Germany 5-1 Norway
Japan 7-6 West Germany
Team roster
Anton Kehle
Heiko Antons
Georg Kink
Rainer Makatsch
Otto Schneitberger
Josef Völk
Werner Modes
Paul Langner
Rudolf Thanner
Karl-Heinz Egger
Rainer Philipp
Bernd Kuhn
Reinhold Bauer
Johann Eimannsberger
Lorenz Funk
Erich Kühnhackl
Alois Schloder
Anton Hofherr
Hans Rothkirch
Martin Wild
Head coach: Gerhard Kießling

Luge

Men

(Men's) Doubles

Women

Nordic combined 

Events:
 normal hill ski jumping (Three jumps, best two counted and shown here.)
 15 km cross-country skiing

Ski jumping

Speed skating

Men

Women

References
Official Olympic Reports
International Olympic Committee results database
 Olympic Winter Games 1972, full results by sports-reference.com

Germany, West
1972
Winter Olympics